King's Station, also known as Moore's and Hollandsville, was a stagecoach station of the Butterfield Overland Mail 1st Division between 1858-1861 in southern California.

The adobe building also served other travelers on the Stockton - Los Angeles Road, and other uses, until its 1928 destruction.

Geography
King's Station was located in the lower section of San Francisquito Canyon, in the Sierra Pelona Mountains.

History
The watering place on San Francisquito Creek was first known as "Moore's" in 1854, and was located on the Stockton - Los Angeles Road wagon route, on the section  between the San Fernando Valley and the San Joaquin Valley.

Butterfield Overland Mail
By 1858, when the New York Herald reporter Waterman L. Ormsby passed through on the Butterfield Overland Mail it was known as King's Station. In 1860 the station was referred to as Hollandsville.

Raggio Ranch — Hollands
About 1880, Charles Raggio, acquired the ranch and adobe station building from the Perea family, and it became known as the Raggio Ranch.

Later in 1894, the adobe was a post office on the Raggio Ranch for the surrounding settlement known as Hollands or Hollandsville.

St. Francis Dam flood and destruction
In March 1928 the massive flood caused by the collapse of the St. Francis Dam washed away the old stagecoach station, along with the Hollands and Raggio Ranch buildings. The dam had been upstream in San Francisquito Canyon.

The only present day indicator of the station's location is the Ruiz family cemetery, that survived by being just above the flood's crest.  The station had been located just below the cemetery. The Ruiz Family Cemetery remains on private land, at 29615 North San Francisquito Canyon Road in Santa Clarita. A mobile home, placed on the property in 1963, is located below the cemetery.

The Raggio Ranch was rebuilt and remained in the family until after the 1940s.

See also
Butterfield Overland Mail in California
Rancho San Francisco

References

External links
 Santa Clarita Valley History in Pictures: Raggio Ranch and San Francisquito Canyon
  Los Angeles Times (December 30, 1989): "Owners Treat Cemetery as a Monument to the Past"
 Deadwrite’s Dailies (March 31, 2011), Tag Archives: "Ruiz Cemetery, In the Wake of the St. Francis Dam"

Butterfield Overland Mail in California
Former settlements in Los Angeles County, California
History of Los Angeles County, California
Santa Clarita, California
Sierra Pelona Ridge
1858 establishments in California
Stagecoach stations in California
Transportation buildings and structures in Los Angeles County, California